Platypelis tsaratananaensis is a species of frog in the family Microhylidae.

The amphibian is endemic to northern Madagascar.

Distribution
The natural habitat of Platypelis tsaratananaensis is subtropical or tropical moist montane forests.  It inhabits tall montane rainforest and bamboo groves, and is probably not found outside mature forest, and is probably restricted to altitudes above .

It is found almost exclusively found on bamboo, and may benefit from the presence of the Daubentonia madagascariensis (nocturnal lemur)  for the creation of holes in the bamboo.

It breeds in bamboo stems by larval development.

Conservation
It is threatened by habitat loss due to subsistence agriculture, timber extraction, charcoal manufacture, spread of invasive eucalyptus trees, livestock grazing, and expanding human settlements.

Sources

Current IUCN Red List of all Threatened Species

t
Endemic frogs of Madagascar
Vulnerable animals
Vulnerable biota of Africa
Species endangered by agricultural development
Species endangered by grazing
Species endangered by habitat loss
Species endangered by invasive species
Species endangered by logging for charcoal
Amphibians described in 1974
Taxa named by Jean Marius René Guibé
Taxonomy articles created by Polbot
Taxobox binomials not recognized by IUCN